Semioscopis aurorella, the aurora flatbody moth, is a species of moth of the family Depressariidae. It was described by Harrison Gray Dyar Jr. in 1902. It is found in Canada from north-central Alberta to south-eastern Ontario, south into the United States between south-central New York and Wisconsin.

The length of the forewings is 11–14 mm. The colouration of the forewings is variable and ranges from yellow grey to pale yellow white.

References

aurorella
Moths of North America
Moths described in 1902